Faroe Islands Premier League Football in the 2006 season.

EB/Streymur were top of the league throughout most of the season, with HB Tórshavn, B36 Tórshavn and NSÍ Runavík staying in contention. With 4 matches left to play, EB/Streymur were 7 points ahead of second placed HB, but after 1 draw and 1 loss for EB/Streymur, HB managed to reduce that lead by 2 points by winning twice. By this time B36, KÍ and NSÍ were out of the title race. With one match left to play, HB Tórshavn's only chance of securing the title was if EB/Streymur lost to KÍ Klaksvík. In addition to that, HB had to win their match against ÍF. But as both matches were locked in stalemates and time was ebbing out, EB/Streymur were on the way to winning the title. 
But then, 82 minutes into the match between EB/Streymur and KÍ, events took a dramatic twist, as Paul Clapson put KÍ 1–0 up against EB/Streymur with a long range effort. But EB/Streymur were still champions at this stage, because HB didn't seem to be able to capitalize on the golden opportunity given by EB/Streymur and KÍ. 

88 minutes had gone in the match between HB and ÍF, and still HB hadn't scored the crucial goal that would hand them the title. But in a last desperate effort, HB's central defender Vagnur Mohr Mortensen joined the attack. A long high ball was sent into ÍF's penalty area on the left where Vagnur headed the ball over a stranded goalkeeper and into the goal for a 1–0 lead and, more importantly, secured HB the 2006 championship title. Deep into stoppage time, Rógvi Jacobsen added another and HB won 2–0.

League table

Results
The schedule consists of a total of 27 games. Each team plays three games against every opponent in no particular order. At least one of the games will be at home and one will be away. The additional home game for every match-up is randomly assigned prior to the season.

Regular home games

Additional home games

Top goalscorers 
 18 goals
  Christian Høgni Jacobsen (NSI)

15 goals
  Súni Fríði Barbá (B68)

 12 goals

  Paul Clapson (KI)
  Rókur Jespersen (HB)
  Amed Davy Sylla (B36)

11 goals

  Arnbjørn Hansen (EB/Steymur)
  Christian Lundberg (KI)
  Oli Hansen (NSI)
  Sorin Anghel (EB/Streymur)

10 goals
  Hans Pauli Samuelsen (EB/Streymur)
  Jákup á Borg (HB)
  Páll Mohr Joensen (HB)

References

Faroe Islands Premier League seasons
1
Faroe
Faroe